Tillandsia belloensis is a species of flowering plant in the genus Tillandsia. This species is native to Mexico and Guatemala.

References

belloensis
Flora of Mexico